Jim Campbell may refer to:

Sports
 Jim Campbell (catcher) (born 1937), MLB (1962–63)
 Jim Campbell (pinch hitter) (born 1943), MLB (1970)
 Jim Campbell (pitcher) (born 1966), MLB (1990)
 Jim Campbell (ice hockey) (born 1973), U.S.
 Jim Campbell (Australian footballer) (1886–1935)
 Jim Campbell (New Zealand footballer), New Zealand

Other
 Jim Campbell (baseball executive) (1924–1995), with the Detroit Tigers
 Jim Campbell (artist) (born 1956), in San Francisco
 Jim Campbell (comics) (born 1977), artist and musician
 Jim Campbell (comedian) (born 1982), English
 Jim Campbell (trade unionist) (1895–1957), British
 James P. Campbell, a.k.a. Jim Campbell, president and CEO of GE Consumer & Industrial

See also
 James Campbell (disambiguation)
 Jimmy Campbell (disambiguation)
 Jamie Campbell (disambiguation)